The Sucker River is a  river in eastern Alger County on the Upper Peninsula of Michigan in the United States. It rises at the outlet of Nawakwa Lake and flows generally north to Lake Superior east of Grand Marais.

See also
List of rivers of Michigan

References

Michigan  Streamflow Data from the USGS

Rivers of Michigan
Rivers of Alger County, Michigan
Tributaries of Lake Superior